The Financial Times Stock Exchange 100 Index, also called the FTSE 100 Index, FTSE 100, FTSE, or, informally, the "Footsie" , is a share index of the 100 companies listed on the London Stock Exchange with (in principle) the highest market capitalisation. The index is maintained by the FTSE Group, a subsidiary of the London Stock Exchange Group.

Overview
The index is maintained by the FTSE Group, now a wholly owned subsidiary of the London Stock Exchange, which originated as a joint venture between the Financial Times and the London Stock Exchange. It is calculated in real time and published every second when the market is open.

The FTSE 100 Index was launched on 3 January 1984. The market capitalisation weighted FTSE 100 index replaced the price-weighted FT30 Index as the performance benchmark for most investors.

The FTSE 100 broadly consists of the largest 100 qualifying UK companies by full market value. The total market value of a company is calculated by multiplying the share price of the company by the total number of shares they have issued. However, many of these are internationally focused companies: therefore the index's movements are a fairly weak indicator of how the UK economy is faring and are significantly affected by the exchange rates of the pound sterling. A better indication of the UK economy is the FTSE 250 Index, as it contains a smaller proportion of international companies.

Even though the FTSE All-Share Index is more comprehensive, the FTSE 100 is by far the most widely used UK stock market indicator. Other related indices are the FTSE 250 Index (which includes the next largest 250 companies after the FTSE 100), the FTSE 350 Index (which is the aggregation of the FTSE 100 and 250), FTSE SmallCap Index and the FTSE Fledgling Index. The FTSE All-Share aggregates the FTSE 100, FTSE 250 and FTSE SmallCap.

To be included in the index, a company must meet a number of requirements set out by the FTSE Group, including having a full listing on the London Stock Exchange with a sterling or Euro denominated price on the Stock Exchange Electronic Trading Service, and meeting certain tests on nationality, free float, and liquidity.

Continuous trading on the London Stock Exchange starts at 08:00 and ends at 16:30 (when the closing auction starts), and closing values are taken at 16:35.

Weighting
In the FTSE indices, share prices are weighted by free-float capitalisation, so that the larger companies, with more of their stock "floating", make more of a difference to the index than smaller companies. The basic formula for these indices is:

The free float adjustment factor represents the percentage of all issued shares that are readily available for trading, rounded up to the nearest multiple of 5%. The free-float capitalisation of a company is its market capitalisation multiplied by its free float adjustment factor. It therefore does not include restricted stocks, such as those held by company insiders.

Futures contracts 
FTSE futures contracts are traded on the Euronext Equities & Index Derivatives (EUREID) exchange. The value of each contract is 10 GBP x Index Points and is specified as:

Record values
The index has reached the following record values:

The index began on 3 January 1984 at the base level of 1000. The highest closing value of 8,012.53 was reached on 16 February 2023. The highest intra-day value of 8,047.06 was also reached on 16 February 2023.

Annual returns
The following table shows the annual development of the calculation of the FT 30 Index from 1969 to 1983, and the FTSE 100 since 1984.

Constituents
The following table lists the FTSE 100 companies after the changes on 18 January 2023.

Past constituents
All changes are due to market capitalisation unless noted otherwise.

 Abbey Life (became subsidiary of Lloyds TSB in 1996, then sold to Deutsche Bank in 2007)
 Abbey National (acquired by Banco Santander Central Hispano, now part of its Santander UK subsidiary)
 Aberdeen Asset Management
 African Barrick Gold
 Aggreko
 Alliance & Leicester (acquired by Banco Santander Central Hispano, now part of its Santander UK subsidiary)
 Alliance Boots (acquired by private equity fund controlled by Kohlberg Kravis Roberts)
 Alliance Trust
 Allied Domecq (acquired by Pernod Ricard)
 Allied Zurich (dual holding company along with Zurich Allied, companies unified in 2000 to form Zurich Financial Services)
 Amec
 Amersham (acquired by GE, now part of its GE Healthcare division)
 Amstrad (acquired by British Sky Broadcasting)
 Argos (acquired by GUS)
 Argyll Group (renamed Safeway in 1996, then taken over by Morrisons in 2004)
 Arjo Wiggins Appleton (acquired by Worms & Cie)
 ARM Holdings (acquired by SoftBank Group)
 ASDA Group (acquired by Wal-Mart)
 Avast (acquired by NortonLifeLock)
 Aveva (acquired by Schneider Electric)
 BAA (acquired by Ferrovial)
 Babcock International
 Balfour Beatty
 Baltimore Technologies (acquired by Oryx International Growth Fund)
 Bank of Scotland (merged with Halifax to form HBOS, now part of the Lloyds Banking Group)
 Bass (became Six Continents and then InterContinental Hotels Group)
 Beecham Group (merged with SmithKline and then with Glaxo to become GlaxoSmithKline)
 Berisford (renamed Enodis, subsequently acquired by The Manitowoc Company)
 BET, formerly British Electric Traction (acquired by Rentokil)
 BG Group (acquired by Royal Dutch Shell)
 BHP (moved main stock listing to the Australian Securities Exchange)
 BICC (renamed Balfour Beatty)
 Blue Arrow (acquired by Corporate Services Group)
 Blue Circle Industries (acquired by Lafarge)
 BOC (acquired by Linde)
 Bowater (renamed Rexam)
 Bookham Technology (renamed Oclaro and now traded on Nasdaq)
 BPB Industries (acquired by Saint-Gobain)
 Bradford & Bingley (branch network acquired by Banco Santander Central Hispano, now part of its Santander UK subsidiary; loans book nationalised)
 Brambles Industries (now only listed on the Australian Securities Exchange)
 British Aerospace (merged with Marconi Electronic Systems to form BAE Systems)
 British Airways (merged with Iberia to form International Airlines Group)
 British Home Stores (acquired by Storehouse and then sold to Philip Green)
 British Steel (merged with Koninklijke Hoogovens to become Corus Group, now Tata Steel Europe)
 British & Commonwealth (collapsed in 1990)
 Britoil (acquired by BP)
 BTR (merged with Siebe to form BTR Siebe, subsequently renamed Invensys)
 Burmah Oil (renamed Burmah Castrol and acquired by BP)
 Burton Group (renamed Arcadia and acquired by Philip Green)
 Cable & Wireless Worldwide
 Cadbury (acquired by Kraft Foods)
 Cairn Energy
 Capita
 Carlton Communications (merged with Granada to form ITV)
 Carnival Corporation & plc
 Carphone Warehouse
 Celltech (acquired by UCB in 2004)
 Centrica
 CMG (merged with Logica to form LogicaCMG)
 Coats Viyella (acquired by Guinness Peat Group and renamed Coats)
 Cobham
 Colt Group
 Commercial Union Assurance (merged with General Accident to form CGU, itself now part of Aviva)
 Consolidated Gold Fields (acquired by Hanson)
 Cookson Group
 Corus Group (acquired by Tata Steel, now forming its Tata Steel Europe division)
 Courtaulds (demerged into two businesses acquired by Sara Lee and Akzo Nobel)
 Daily Mail and General Trust
 Dalgety (renamed PIC International and then Sygen International and subsequently acquired by Genus)
 Darktrace
 Dechra Pharmaceuticals
 Debenhams
 De La Rue
 Dimension Data Holdings (market capitalisation fell too low, subsequently acquired by Nippon Telegraph and Telephone)
 Direct Line Group
 Distillers (acquired by Guinness and now part of Diageo)
 Dixons Carphone
 Dixons Group (renamed to DSG International and then Dixons Retail; market capitalisation also fell too low)
 Dowty Group (acquired by TI Group, itself now part of Smiths Group)
 DSG International (renamed Dixons Retail; market capitalisation also fell too low)
 Eagle Star (acquired by BAT Industries and then demerged as part of Zurich Financial Services)
 Eastern Group (acquired by Hanson, renamed The Energy Group; acquired by Texas Utilities)
 EasyJet
 ECC Group (acquired by Imetal)
 Edinburgh Investment Trust
 Electrocomponents
 EMAP (acquired by Apax Partners and the Guardian Media Group)
 EMI Group (acquired by Terra Firma Capital Partners, now owned by Citigroup)
 Energis (acquired by Cable and Wireless)
 Enterprise Inns
 Enterprise Oil (acquired by Royal Dutch Shell)
 Essar Energy
 Eurasian Natural Resources Corporation
 Eurotunnel
 Evraz
 Exco International (acquired by British & Commonwealth Holdings)
 Exel (acquired by Deutsche Post)
 Ferguson (moved main listing to New York Stock Exchange)
 Ferranti International (collapsed in 1993)
 Ferrexpo
 FirstGroup
 Fisons (acquired by Rhone-Poulenc Rorer, now Sanofi-Aventis)
 Forte (acquired by Granada, now ITV)
 Freeserve (acquired by France Télécom, now Orange)
 Friends Life (acquired by Aviva)
 Friends Provident (acquired by Friends Life Group)
 G4S
 Gallaher Group (acquired by Japan Tobacco)
 Gateway Corporation (renamed Somerfield, subsequently acquired by The Co-operative Group)
 GEC, formerly General Electric Company (renamed Marconi, broken up, remnant renamed Telent)
 General Accident (merged with Commercial Union to form CGU, itself now part of Aviva)
 George Wimpey (merged with Taylor Woodrow to form Taylor Wimpey)
 Glaxo Wellcome (merged with SmithKline Beecham to form GlaxoSmithKline)
 Globe Investment Trust (acquired by British Coal Pension Fund)
 Granada Compass (split in 2001 to leave Granada and Compass Group)
 Granada (merged with Carlton Communications to form ITV)
 Greenall's Group (renamed De Vere Group and then acquired by a joint venture of private investors)
 Grand Metropolitan (merged with Guinness to form Diageo)
 Guardian Royal Exchange (acquired by Axa)
 Guinness (merged with Grand Metropolitan to form Diageo)
 GUS (now demerged into Home Retail Group and Experian)
 GVC Holdings
 Habitat Mothercare (merged with British Home Stores to form Storehouse and subsequently renamed Mothercare again)
 Halifax Group (merged with the Bank of Scotland to form HBOS)
 Hambro Life (renamed Allied Dunbar and acquired by BAT Industries and then demerged as part of Zurich Financial Services)
 Hammerson
 Hanson (acquired by Heidelberg Cement)
 Harbour Energy
 Harrisons & Crosfield (renamed Elementis)
 Hawker Siddeley (acquired by BTR, now Invensys)
 Hays
 HBOS Group plc (acquired by Lloyds Banking Group)
 Hikma Pharmaceuticals
 Hillsdown Holdings (acquired by Hicks, Muse, Tate and Furst and then sold on as Premier Foods)
 Hiscox
 Home Retail Group
 Homeserve (acquired by Brookfield Asset Management)
 House of Fraser (acquired by Baugur)
 Howdens Joinery
 ICAP
 IMI
 Imperial Chemical Industries (acquired by Akzo Nobel)
 Imperial Continental Gas Association (broke up into Calor and Contibel)
 Inchcape
 Inmarsat
 Innogy Holdings (renamed Npower and acquired by RWE)
 Intermediate Capital Group
 International Power (acquired by GDF Suez)
 Intu 
 Invensys
 Invesco (moved primary listing to NYSE)
 Investec
 ITV
 Jaguar (acquired by Ford and then by Tata Motors)
 Just Eat Takeaway (nationality reassigned to the Netherlands)
 Kazakhmys
 Kelda Group (acquired by Saltaire Water consortium) a consortium of investment companies including Citigroup and HSBC.
 Kingfisher
 Kingston Communications (renamed KCOM Group and market capitalisation fell too low)
 Kwik Save Group (merged with Somerfield)
 Ladbrokes
 Laporte (major divisions acquired by Kohlberg Kravis Roberts)
 Lasmo (acquired by Eni)
 Lattice Group (merged with National Grid to form National Grid Transco)
 Logica
 London Electricity (acquired by Électricité de France, now part of its EDF Energy division)
 Lonhro (renamed Lonmin)
 Lonmin
 Lucas Industries (merged with Varity to form LucasVarity, then acquired by TRW)
 LucasVarity (acquired by TRW)
 Magnet and Southerns (acquired by Berisford)
 Man Group
 Marks & Spencer
 Maxwell Communications Corporation (collapsed in 1991)
 MB-Caradon (renamed Caradon and then Novar, then acquired by Honeywell)
 Mediclinic International
 Meggitt (acquired by Parker Hannifin)
 Melrose
 MEPC (acquired by Leconport Estates)
 Mercury Asset Management (acquired by Merrill Lynch)
 Merlin Entertainments
 MFI Furniture (renamed Galiform and then Howden Joinery and market capitalisation fell too low)
 Micro Focus International
 Midlands Electricity (acquired by Acquila Sterling, now part of E.ON Energy UK)
 Midland Bank (acquired by HSBC)
 Misys
 Mitchells & Butlers
 Morrisons (acquired by Clayton, Dubilier & Rice)
 National Westminster Bank (acquired by Royal Bank of Scotland Group)
 NFC (merged with Ocean Group to form Exel, now part of Deutsche Post)
 NMC Health
 Northern Foods (market capitalisation fell too low, before being acquired by Ranjit Boparan)
 Northern Rock (market capitalisation fell too low, before being nationalised)
 Norwich Union (merged with CGU to form CGNU, now Aviva)
 Nycomed Amersham (acquired by GE)
 O2 (renamed Telefónica Europe following acquisition by Telefónica)
 Old Mutual (managed separation of the business)
 Orange (acquired by Mannesmann and then by France Télécom, now Orange)
 PartyGaming (market capitalisation fell too low, before merging with Bwin to become bwin.party digital entertainment)
 P&O (acquired by Dubai Ports World)
 P&O Princess Cruises (merged with Carnival Corporation and re-listed as Carnival Corporation & plc)
 Pennon Group
 Petrofac
 Pilkington (acquired by Nippon Sheet Glass)
 Plessey (acquired by GEC and Siemens)
 Polly Peck (collapsed in 1990)
 Polymetal International
 PowerGen (acquired by E.ON Energy UK)
 Provident Financial
 Psion
 Punch Taverns
 Racal Electronics (acquired by Thomson-CSF and then Thales Group)
 Railtrack (collapsed in 2001)
 Randgold Resources (merged with Barrick Gold Corp)
 Rank Hovis McDougall (acquired by Premier Foods)
 Reckitt and Coleman (merged with Benckiser to form Reckitt Benckiser)
 Redland (acquired by Lafarge)
 Reed International (merged with Elsevier to form Reed Elsevier)
 Renishaw
 Rentokil Initial
 Resolution Limited (changed its name to Friends Life Group)
 Resolution plc (acquired by Pearl Group)
 Rexam (acquired by Ball Corporation)
 RMC Group (acquired by Cemex)
 Rothmans International (acquired by British American Tobacco)
 J Rothschild (renamed St. James's Place and market capitalisation fell too low)
 Rowntree's (acquired by Nestlé)
 Royal Insurance (merged with Sun Alliance Group to form Royal & SunAlliance)
 Royal Mail
 RSA Insurance Group (acquired by Danish insurer Tryg and Canada's Intact Financial Corporation in May 2021).
 Saatchi & Saatchi (acquired by Publicis)
 Safeway (acquired by Morrisons)
 SABMiller (acquired by Anheuser-Busch InBev)
 Scottish & Newcastle (acquired by a consortium formed of Heineken & Carlsberg)
 Scottish Hydro Electric (merged with Southern Electric to form Scottish and Southern Energy)
 Scottish Power (acquired by Iberdrola)
 Sears (acquired by January Investments – itself controlled by Philip Green)
 Securicor (merged with Group 4 Falck to form G4S)
 Sedgwick (acquired by Marsh & McLennan)
 Sema Group (acquired by Schlumberger)
 Serco
 Shell Transport and Trading Company (now re-organised with Royal Dutch Petroleum Company as Royal Dutch Shell)
 Shire (acquired by Takeda Pharmaceutical Company)
 Siebe (merged with BTR to form Invensys)
 Sky (acquired by Comcast)
 SmithKline Beecham (merged with Glaxo Wellcome to form GlaxoSmithKline)
 Smiths Industries (renamed to Smiths Group)
 Southern Electric (merged with Scottish Hydro Electric to form Scottish and Southern Energy)
 Spirent
 Sports Direct
 Stagecoach Group
 Standard Telephones and Cables (renamed STC and acquired by Nortel)
 Storehouse (renamed Mothercare)
 Sun Alliance Group (merged with Royal Insurance to form Royal & Sun Alliance)
 Sun Life Assurance (acquired by Axa)
 Sun Life & Provincial Holdings (acquired by Axa)
 Tarmac (acquired by Anglo American)
 Tate & Lyle
 Taylor Wimpey
 Taylor Woodrow (merged with George Wimpey to form Taylor Wimpey)
 Telewest Communications (merged with NTL to form NTL:Telewest now Virgin Media)
 Thames Water (acquired by RWE and then sold to Macquarie Group)
 The Energy Group (acquired by Texas Utilities)
 Thomas Cook Group
 Thomson Reuters (delisted shares from the London Stock Exchange as it ceased to be a dual-listed company)
 Thorn (acquired by Nomura Group)
 Thorn EMI (renamed EMI Group and then acquired by Terra Firma Capital Partners)
 Thus (market capitalisation fell too low, subsequently acquired by Cable & Wireless Worldwide)
 TI Group (acquired by Smiths Group)
 Tomkins (acquired by Onex Corporation and Canada Pension Plan Investment Board)
 Trafalgar House (acquired by Kværner)
 Travis Perkins
 TSB Group (merged with Lloyds Bank to form Lloyds TSB)
 Trusthouse Forte (acquired by Granada)
 TUI Group
 TUI Travel
 Tullow Oil
 Ultramar (acquired by Lasmo and now part of Eni)
 Unigate (renamed Uniq, then market capitalisation fell too low)
 United Biscuits (acquired by consortium of financial investors)
 United Business Media
 Vedanta Resources
 Warburg SG (acquired by Swiss Bank Corporation, now part of UBS)
 Wellcome (merged with Glaxo to form Glaxo Wellcome, then with SmithKline Beecham to form GlaxoSmithKline)
 WH Smith
 William Hill
 Williams Holdings (demerged into Kidde and Chubb Fire & Security, both now part of United Technologies)
 Willis Corroon (acquired by Trinity Acquisition on behalf of Kohlberg Kravis Roberts and renamed Willis Group)
 Willis Faber (acquired by Trinity Acquisition on behalf of Kohlberg Kravis Roberts and renamed Willis Coroon and then Willis Group)
 Wood Group
 Worldpay (acquired by Vantiv)
 Woolwich (acquired by Barclays)
 Yell Group
 Zeneca (merged with Astra to form AstraZeneca)

Source: "FTSE: FTSE 100 Constituent Changes"

FT 30

The oldest continuous index in the UK is the FT 30, also known as the Financial Times Index or the FT Ordinary Index (FTOI). It was established in 1935 and nowadays is largely obsolete due to its redundancy. It is similar to the Dow Jones Industrial Average, and companies listed are from the industrial and commercial sectors. Financial sector companies and government stocks are excluded.

Of the original constituents, three are currently in the FTSE 100: Tate & Lyle, Imperial Tobacco and Rolls-Royce, although Rolls-Royce has not been continuously listed and Imperial Tobacco was a subsidiary of Hanson for a number of years, and is now renamed as Imperial Brands. Only one of the original FT 30 companies is still in that index: Tate & Lyle (membership is not strictly based on market capitalisation, so this does not mean they are necessarily among the top thirty companies in the FTSE 100). The best performer from the original lineup has been Imperial Tobacco.

See also
Other lists
 List of corporate collapses and scandals, on major bankruptcies historically and worldwide
 List of hedge funds
 List of largest companies by revenue, worldwide
 List of largest companies in the United Kingdom
 List of largest United Kingdom employers, including the public sector
 List of private-equity firms

Stock market lists
 AEX index
 Dow Jones Industrial Average and the DAX 30, equivalent to the FT 30 in the US and Germany
 Financial Times Global 500, the BBC Global 30 and the Fortune Global 500, list the world's largest corporations by market capitalisation
 FTSE 250 and FTSE techMARK 100, a longer FT list, and one for the "new economy"
 List of European stock exchanges
 List of stock exchanges
 List of stock market indices
 S&P 100 and the HDAX, top 100 in the US and top 110 in Germany

References

 1
FTSE 100 Index
FTSE Group stock market indices
1984 establishments in the United Kingdom
British stock market indices